Finger Point is a point which forms the southwest end of Skua Island in the Argentine Islands, Wilhelm Archipelago. It was charted and named by the British Graham Land Expedition, 1934–37, under John Rymill.

References 

Headlands of the Wilhelm Archipelago